Puhar (also known as Poompuhar) is a town in the Mayiladuthurai district in the southern Indian state of Tamil Nadu. It was once a flourishing ancient port city known as Kaveri Poompattinam, which is described in Sangam literature like Silappadikaram, Manimekalai, Pattinapalai and Akananuru as the capital of the Early Chola kings in Tamilakam. Puhar is located near the mouth of the Kaveri river, on the sea coast. It is mentioned in the Periplus of the Erythraean Sea.

It has now been established by marine archaeological research (conducted by the National institute of marine archaeology, Goa) that much of the town was washed away by progressive erosion and floods. In the 1960s and 1970s, archaeological research was conducted under the leadership of the noted archaeologist K. V. Soundararajan. Submerged wharves and several meter lengths of pier walls excavated in recent times have corroborated the literary references to Poompuhar. It was rebuilt several times after that. Ancient Pottery dating back to the 4th century BCE have been discovered off shore by marine archaeologists east of this town.

City layout

The general plan of the city of Puhar is described in considerable detail in the fifth book of Silapathikaram. The town was built on the north banks of the river Kaveri.   The town had two distinct districts, Maruvurpakkam near the sea and Pattinappakkam to its west. These two villages were separated by a stretch of gardens and orchards where daily markets were held under the shades of the trees. The market place was known as Naalangadi during the day and as allangadi by night.

Maruvurpakkam
The district of Maruvurpakkam was near the beach and had several terraced mansions and warehoused with windows shaped like the eyes of the deer. Maruvurpakkam being close to the shore and hence to the shipyard was naturally preferred by the many overseas travellers, merchants and yavanas (Greeks).

Maruvurpakkam was inhabited by the fisher folk. The town had several warehouses. Weavers, silk merchants, vendors, fish and meat sellers, potters, grain merchants, jewellers and diamond makers lived in Maruvurppakkam.

Pattinappakkam
The King and nobles, rich traders, physicians, astrologers, members of the king's army and court dancers occupied Pattinappakkam. The five Manrams - Vellidai Manram, Elanchi Manram, Nedankal manram, Poothachathukkam and Pavaimanram were located in Pattinappakkam. Gardens like Elavanthikaicholai, Uyyanam, Chanpathivanam, Uvavanam, and Kaveravanam added beauty to the town.

In culture

The city of Poompuhar is a very ancient one.

Descriptions in Tamil poetic works
A Purananuru poem (poem 30) says that big ships entered the port of Puhar without slacking sail, and poured out onto the beach precious merchandise brought from overseas. In the extensive markets of Puhar there were many tall mansions surrounded by platforms reached by high ladders. These mansions had many apartments and were provided with doorways, great and small, and with wide hallways and corridors (Pattinappaalai – II –142-158). In all parts of the town there were flags flying of various kinds and shapes.

Pattinappaalai, a poem that describes the ancient Puhar very vividly, was written by the poet Kadiyalur Uruthirangannanaar is part of the Ten Idylls anthology and was sung in praise of Karikala Chola, a first-century BCE Chola king.

In Buddhist literature

Buddhadatta, the 5th century writer who lived during the reign of Accutavikkante vividly describes the capital Kaveripattinam in his manuals (Pali language) as follows:

In the lovely Kaveripattana crowded with hordes of men and women from pure families 
endowed with all the requisites of a town with crystal clear water flowing in the river, 
filled with all kinds of precious stones, 
possessed of many kinds of bazaars,
beautified by many gardens,
in a beautiful and pleasant vihara built by Kanhadasa,
adorned with a mansion as high as the Kailasa,
and having different kinds of beautiful entrance-towers on the outer wall,
I lived in an old mansion there and wrote this work..

In the Nigamanagātha of Vinayavinicchaya, Buddhatta describes how he wrote the work while staying at the monastery built by one Venhudassa (Vishnudasa) on the banks of the Kaveri in a town called Bhootamangalam near Kaveripattinam.

Merchants of Puhar
Pattinappaalai also gives an idealised description of the merchants plying their trade in Puhar (Pattinappaalai – II –199-212):

They shunned murder, and put aside theft, pleased the gods by fire offerings,…they regarded others rights as scrupulously as their own, they took nothing more than was due to them and never gave less than was due from them. Trading thus in many articles of merchandise, they enjoyed an ancient heritage of prosperity and lived in close proximity to one another.

City's destruction
The ancient city of Puhar was destroyed by the sea around 300 AD. Marine archaeologists from the National Institute of Oceanography have established that this could have been the effects of sediment erosion and periodic tsunamis. Such a tsunami is mentioned in the Tamil poem Manimekhalai (see below), which relates that the town Kāveripattinam or Puhār was swallowed up by the sea. This event is supported by archaeological finds of submerged ruins off the coast of modern Poompuhar. 
The town of Kāveripattinam is believed to have disappeared around 300 AD due to this tsunami

Manimekalai
The ancient Tamil poem Manimekalai by the poet Seethalai Saathanar is set in the town of Kaveripattanam.
Ancient ruins of a 4th-5th-century Buddhist monastery, a Buddha statue, and a Buddhapada (footprint of the Buddha) were found in another section of the ancient city, now at Pallavanesvaram.
Also some claim that Manimekalai attained Mukti there.

Geography

It is at a distance of 24km from Mayiladuthurai and 40km Chidambaram.

Politics
Poompuhar assembly constituency is part of Mayiladuturai (Lok Sabha constituency).

Tourism

Attractions in Poompuhar include:
 Silappathikara Art Gallery: Scenes from Silappadikaram are depicted in sculptures carved by the students of the Mamallapuram Art College.
 Masilamani Nathar Koil, Tarangambadi: Built in 1305 by Maravarma Kulasekara Pandiyan, this temple has been heavily eroded by the sea.

Gallery

Notes

References 

 Mudaliar, A.S, Abithana Chintamani (1931), Reprinted 1984 Asian Educational Services, New Delhi.
 Nilakanta Sastri, K.A. (1935). The CōĻas, University of Madras, Madras (Reprinted 1984).
 
 Wayback Machine

External links
 PoomPuhar College
 Poompugar in Memories in Asia

Cities and towns in Mayiladuthurai district
Ancient Indian cities
Former populated places in India
Buddhism amongst Tamils
Former capital cities in India